The 171st New York State Legislature, consisting of the New York State Senate and the New York State Assembly, met from January 9, 1957, to March 26, 1958, during the third and fourth years of W. Averell Harriman's governorship, in Albany.

Background
Under the provisions of the New York Constitution of 1938, re-apportioned in 1953, 58 Senators and 150 assemblymen were elected in single-seat districts for two-year terms. The senatorial districts consisted either of one or more entire counties; or a contiguous area within a single county. The counties which were divided into more than one senatorial district were Kings (nine districts), New York (six),  Queens (five), Bronx (four), Erie (three), Nassau (three), Westchester (three), Monroe (two) and Onondaga (two). The Assembly districts consisted either of a single entire county (except Hamilton Co.), or of contiguous area within one county.

At this time there were two major political parties: the Republican Party and the Democratic Party. The Liberal Party also nominated tickets.

Elections
The 1956 New York state election, was held on November 6. The only statewide elective office up for election was a U.S. Senator from New York. The Republican Attorney General Jacob K. Javits defeated the Democratic/Liberal Mayor of New York Robert F. Wagner Jr. The approximate party strength at this election, as expressed by the vote for U.S. Senator, was: Republicans 3,724,000; Democrats 2,965,000; and Liberals 301,000.

Five of the six women members of the previous legislature—Assemblywomen Bessie A. Buchanan (Dem.), a retired musical actress and dancer of Harlem; Janet Hill Gordon (Rep.), a lawyer of Norwich; Frances K. Marlatt (Rep.), a lawyer of Mount Vernon; Genesta M. Strong (Rep.), of Plandome Heights; and Mildred F. Taylor (Rep.), a coal dealer of Lyons—were re-elected.

The New York state election, 1957, was held on November 5. No statewide elective offices were up for election. Three vacancies in the State Senate and three vacancies in the Assembly were filled.

Sessions
The Legislature met for the first regular session (the 180th) at the State Capitol in Albany on January 9, 1957; and adjourned on March 30.

Oswald D. Heck (Rep.) was re-elected Speaker.

Walter J. Mahoney (Rep.) was re-elected Temporary President of the State Senate.

The Legislature met for a special session at the State Capitol in Albany on June 10, 1957; and adjourned on June 13. This session was called, among other things, to consider legislation concerning worker benefits and telephone rates.

The Legislature met for the second regular session (the 181st) at the State Capitol in Albany on January 8, 1958; and adjourned on March 26.

State Senate

Districts

Senators
The asterisk (*) denotes members of the previous Legislature who continued in office as members of this Legislature. Elisha T. Barrett and Thomas A. Duffy changed from the Assembly to the Senate at the beginning of this Legislature. Assemblymen John H. Farrell and A. Gould Hatch were elected to fill vacancies in the Senate.

Note: For brevity, the chairmanships omit the words "...the Committee on (the)..."

Employees
 Secretary: William S. King

State Assembly

Assemblymen

Note: For brevity, the chairmanships omit the words "...the Committee on (the)..."

Employees
 Clerk: Ansley B. Borkowski
 Sergeant-at-Arms: Raymond J. Roche
 Deputy Journal Clerk: Maude E. Ten Eyck

Notes

Sources
 Members of the New York Senate (1950s) at Political Graveyard
 Members of the New York Assembly (1950s) at Political Graveyard

171
1957 in New York (state)
1958 in New York (state)
1957 U.S. legislative sessions
1956 U.S. legislative sessions